North Muskegon High School is a public high school in west Michigan. The school was founded in 1935 and is a class C size school. The small population of Elementary, Middle School, and High School student all share one building creating a tightknit community of students and staff.

The Middle School and High School share one principal (Jennifer Schultz) and many members of the faculty.

Education
North Muskegon High School has a strong basic four-year college preparatory program.  For students selecting other courses of study, the Career Tech Center offers a wide variety of additional classes.  Prior to ninth grade, counselors meet with every student and parent to define the academic goals to be pursued during the high school years.
North Muskegon High School is fully accredited by the State of Michigan and the North Central Association.

In 2010, North Muskegon High School was noted as the top performing public school in the State of Michigan by the Michigan Department of Education.

Athletics
North Muskegon offers fifteen interscholastic sports at the high school level to its athletes.  Boys' programs include: Football, Cross Country, Golf, Basketball, Track and Field, Baseball, Soccer, and Tennis.  Girls' programs include: Basketball, Cross Country, Tennis, Soccer, Side-Line Cheerleading and Competitive Cheerleading, Volleyball, Track and Field and Softball.  North Muskegon is a Division IV, Class C school and competes in the West Michigan Conference.

In recent years, many of the athletic teams have received "Top Ten" rankings along with finishing at high levels in the state tournaments.  In addition, intramural programs are offered to the high school, middle school and elementary students.

Clubs and Extracurricular activities
Spanish Club
French Club
Math Club
Girls' Club
Destination Imagination
Drama Club
Robotics Club
Student Council
National Honor Society
Band
Orchestra
Choir
Close-Up
SADD
Yearbook
First Priority
Mock Trial
Pride Club

References

North Muskegon Public Schools website

Public high schools in Michigan
Educational institutions established in 1935
Schools in Muskegon County, Michigan
1935 establishments in Michigan